James Auckland and Dick Norman were the defending champions, but chose not to defend their title.
Eric Butorac and Lovro Zovko won the event, beating Kevin Anderson and Dominik Hrbatý 6–4, 3–6, [10–6] in the final.

Seeds

Draw

Draw

References
 Doubles Draw

Open de Rennes - Doubles
2009 Doubles